MSSA may refer to:

 Member of the Order of the Star of South Africa
 Methicillin-sensitive Staphylococcus aureus, a subspecies of bacterium
 Military Selective Service Act, a law establishing the current Selective Service System in the United States
 Military-style semi-automatic, a firearm (abbreviation commonly used in New Zealand) 
 Mind Sports South Africa
 Montreal Student Space Associations
 MSSA Chemical company, a French chemical company, also known as Métaux Spéciaux
 Master of Science in Social Administration, master's degree from the Mandel School at Case Western Reserve University, equivalent to a master of social work
 Multi-channel/-variate Singular spectrum analysis, an extension of the SSA technique